Privolzhsky (masculine), Privolzhskaya (feminine), or Privolzhskoye (neuter) is the name of several inhabited localities in Russia.

Urban localities
Privolzhsky, Mari El Republic, an urban-type settlement in Volzhsky District of the Mari El Republic
Privolzhsky, Saratov Oblast, a work settlement in Engelssky District of Saratov Oblast

Rural localities
Privolzhsky, Nizhny Novgorod Oblast, a settlement in Fokinsky Selsoviet of Vorotynsky District of Nizhny Novgorod Oblast
Privolzhsky, Republic of Tatarstan, a settlement in Spassky District of the Republic of Tatarstan
Privolzhsky, Tver Oblast, a settlement in Kimrsky District of Tver Oblast
Privolzhsky, Volgograd Oblast, a settlement in Privolzhsky Selsoviet of Svetloyarsky District of Volgograd Oblast
Privolzhsky, Yaroslavl Oblast, a settlement in Klimovsky Rural Okrug of Nekrasovsky District of Yaroslavl Oblast
Privolzhskoye, Marksovsky District, Saratov Oblast, a selo in Marksovsky District of Saratov Oblast
Privolzhskoye, Rovensky District, Saratov Oblast, a selo in Rovensky District of Saratov Oblast